Raw & Uncut is the second solo studio album by American rapper Turk. It was released on August 12, 2003 via Koch Records, making it his first album for the label after parting ways with Cash Money Records. Production was mainly handled by Ke'Noe, who also served as executive producer, and Sinista, Don Waun, KLC and UP. It features guest appearances from Ke'Noe, Tooley, B.G. and Bubba Sparxxx. The album was less successful than his previous one, peaking at  No. 193 on the Billboard 200, No. 22 on the Top R&B/Hip-Hop Albums and No. 15 on the Independent Albums. As of 2008, the album has sold close to 100,000 copies.

Track listing

Charts

References

External links

2003 albums
E1 Music albums
Turk (rapper) albums